Butch Davis (born 1951) is an American football coach.

Butch Davis may also refer to:

Butch Davis (baseball, born 1958), American baseball player
Butch Davis (Negro leagues) (1916–1988), American baseball player